Ján Harbuľák (born 15 November 1988) is a Slovak football defender who plays for Austrian club SV Gols.

References

External links

 

1988 births
Living people
Slovak footballers
Association football defenders
FC Nitra players
Slovak Super Liga players
Sportspeople from Nitra